Ilinden is a town in North Macedonia. It is a seat of the Ilinden Municipality. It is also very commonly referred by its old name Belimbegovo, in spite of the fact that the name was changed in 1951.

Demographics
As of the 2021 census, Ilinden had 5,161 residents with the following ethnic composition:
Macedonians 4,230
Persons for whom data are taken from administrative sources 414
Albanians 326
Serbs 111
Others 59
Roma 21

According to the 2002 census, the settlement had a total of 4931 inhabitants. Ethnic groups in the suburb include:
Macedonians 4285
Albanians 340
Serbs 176
Romani 31
Turks 2
Vlachs 1
Others 96

References

See also 
 Ilinden - important historic date
 Ilinden Municipality

Villages in Ilinden Municipality